Kim Jae-Yup (born May 17, 1965) is a retired South Korean judoka.

At the age of 19, he became runner-up in the extra-lightweight (60 kg) division in the 1984 LA Olympics, losing to Shinji Hosokawa of Japan, who was the resigning world champion, by ippon.

History
But three years later, Kim went up against Hosokawa in the final again at the World Championship held in Essen, Germany, and avenged the loss, beating by ippon.

In the 1988 Seoul Olympics, Kim finally captured an Olympic gold medal by defeating Kevin Asano of the United States, dominating all the matches without allowing any single point.

He currently serves as a full-time professor at Dong Seoul College in South Korea.

External links
 

1965 births
Living people
Judoka at the 1984 Summer Olympics
Judoka at the 1988 Summer Olympics
Olympic judoka of South Korea
Olympic gold medalists for South Korea
Olympic silver medalists for South Korea
Olympic medalists in judo
Asian Games medalists in judo
Judoka at the 1986 Asian Games
South Korean male judoka
Medalists at the 1988 Summer Olympics
Medalists at the 1984 Summer Olympics
Asian Games gold medalists for South Korea
Medalists at the 1986 Asian Games
South Korean Buddhists
21st-century South Korean people
20th-century South Korean people